Centurions is an American science fiction animated television series produced by Ruby-Spears and was animated in Japan by Nippon Sunrise's Studio 7. Comic book artists Jack Kirby and Gil Kane contributed to the design and concepts of the show while Norio Shioyama did the character designs. The series began in 1986 as a five-part mini-series and was followed with a 60-episode series. The series was story edited by Ted Pedersen and written by several authors, including prolific science fiction writers Michael Reaves, Marc Scott Zicree, Larry DiTillio and Gerry Conway.

The series theme and soundtrack were composed by Udi Harpaz. There was also a line of tie-in toys by Kenner and a comic book series by DC Comics.

The show revolves around the conflict between Doc Terror's cyborgs and the Centurions (a combination of hard-suit and a mecha).

Premise
 
In the near future of the 21st century, the cyborg mad scientist Doc Terror seeks to conquer the Earth and turn its inhabitants into robot slaves. He is assisted by his cyborg companion Hacker and an army of robots. There were many types of cyborgs:

 Doom Drones Traumatizers – The most commonly seen drones are walking robots with laser blasters for arms. The toy for the Traumatizer was a Sears store exclusive. The Traumatizer Leader was colored red.
 Doom Drones Strafers – A flying robot armed with missiles and lasers. Doc Terror and Hacker are able to fly by swapping their pure robot half for a Strafer.
 Groundborgs – A land-based robot armed with lasers that move on treads. No toy was made of Groundborgs.
 Cybervore Panther – A robot panther. Introduced later in the series. Could combine with the Cybervore Shark. A toy for the Cybervore Panther was designed but never released.
 Cybervore Shark – A robot shark. Introduced later in the series. Could combine with the Cybervore Panther. A toy for the Cybervore Shark was designed but never released.

Later, a wheeled Drone with a large screen and cannons as well as a submarine drone were added. They are joined on many occasions, starting with the first episode, by Doc Terror's daughter Amber.

At each turn, their evil plans are thwarted by the heroic Centurions. The Centurions are a team of men dressed in specially created exo-frames that allows them (upon shouting "PowerXtreme") to fuse with 'incredible' assault weapon systems, becoming what the show calls man and machine, Power Xtreme! The end result is a weapons platform somewhere between a hard-suit and a mecha. Originally, there were three Centurions but two other Centurions were added later:

Original Team:

 Max Ray – 'Brilliant' Sea Operations Commander: The calm and collected de facto leader of the team, donning a green exo-frame suit and sporting a fine mustache. His toy file card said that for exercise he regularly swam from California to Hawaii and back. His weapon systems are best suited for underwater missions, some of these are as follows:
 Cruiser – A sea assault weapon system that is used in and out of the water and includes hydro thrusters, a keel-fin radar unit, and a missile launcher. Max wears this with a green helmet that matches his exo-frame.
 Tidal Blast – A powerful surface-sub-surface attack weapon system with two hydro-powered keel-fins used for above and below the water that has battle modes such as cruise, subsonic speed, and rear attack. Its weapons include a re-pulsar lesion cannon and two rotating and firing shark missiles. Like Cruiser, Max wears this with a green helmet.
 Depth Charger – A deep-sea weapon system used for deep underwater missions. It is a mini-sub with two pivoting pontoon thrusters and two mobile directional aqua fins that has modes of attack such as diving, full fire, and deep sea. Its weapons include two rotating aqua cannons, deep-sea torpedoes, and a hydro mine.
 Sea Bat – Released in the second phase of the toys' release.
 Fathom Fan - Released in the second series of the toys' release.
 Jake Rockwell – 'Rugged' Land Operations Specialist: Donning a yellow exo-frame suit. A passionate idealist with a strong moral compass, he has a short fuse that often puts him at odds with the cocky and casual personality of Ace. His weapon systems have the most firepower and are best suited for land missions, some of these are as follows:
 Fireforce – A powerful land assault weapon system that includes twin laser cannons and a rotating plasma re-pulsar. Jake wears this with a yellow helmet that matches his exo-frame.
 Wild Weasel – A protective armor assault weapon system in the shape of a motorcycle with a head shield and protective back shell for dangerous missions such as heavy forests or rocky terrains. It has battle modes including tracking, anti-aircraft, high-speed travel, and land attack. Its weapons include two land lasers and a front assault pack module for storing accessories.
 Detonator – A heavy artillery weapon system for maximum firepower. It has many battle modes including air attack and ground assault. Its weapons include sonic ray guns and freeze ray blasters. Like Fireforce, Jake wears this with a yellow helmet.
 Hornet – An assault helicopter weapon system used to assist Aerial missions that has battle modes including surveillance, high-speed assault, and sneak attack. Its weapons include four sidewinder missiles and a rotating freeze cannon.
 Swingshot – Released in the second phase of the toys' release.
 Ace McCloud – 'Daring' Air Operations Expert: Donning a blue exo-frame suit, he is a brave but cocky womanizer who is sometimes at odds with Jake. His weapon systems are best suited for aerial missions, some of these are as follows:
Skyknight – A powerful air assault weapon system that has two turbo thrusters. Its weapons include stinsel missiles, laser cannons, and laser bombs. Ace wears these with a blue helmet that matches his exo-frame.
 Orbital Interceptor – An advanced air weapon assault system with inner atmospheric thrusters that can even be used in space. It has battle modes including cruise, pursuit, and power blast. Its weapons include two particle beam deflectors and a particle beam missile. Ace wears this with a life support helmet.
 Skybolt – An air reinforcement weapon system that has two booster stabilizer pods, radar tracking wings, and modular invertible wings with battle modes including reconnaissance, backfire, and anti-attack. Its weapons include galactic missiles and two backfire missile launchers for front and rear attacks. Like Skyknight, Ace wears this with a blue helmet.
 Strato Strike – The toy for Strato Strike was designed, but never released.

Extended Team (later additions):
 Rex Charger – 'Expert' Energy Programmer. Dons a red and pale green exo-frame suit.
Electro Charger -
Gatling Guard -
 John Thunder – 'Specialist' Infiltration Commander. Has a black exo-frame with exposed skin.
Silent Arrow -
Thunder Knife -

The Centurions are based on an orbiting space station called Sky Vault where its operator, Crystal Kane, uses a transporter to send the Centurions, and the requested weapon systems, to where they are needed. Crystal is always in the company of either Jake Rockwell's dog Shadow or Lucy the orangutan or in most cases both. Shadow is usually more involved with the Centurions' battles than Lucy and sports a harness with dual missile launchers. Crystal suggests tactics and sends equipment as required. The Centurions also have a hidden base in New York City called Centrum. Its entrance is hidden in a book store and must be reached via an underground railcar. Centrum serves as the Centurions' land base of operations and also has a beaming pod for rapid transport to Sky Vault. In addition to Sky Vault and Centrum, there is also a Centurion Academy whose location is kept completely secret and only seen in the last 5 episodes.

Much like the Super Friends' additions of Black Vulcan, Apache Chief, Samurai, and, El Dorado to introduce racial diversity into the series, The Centurions saw the addition of Rex Charger, the energy expert, and John Thunder, the Apache infiltration expert.

Themes
As well as the adventure side of the show, the series considered various science fiction themes. In particular, the fusion or relationship between humans and technology was a focus throughout the show's run. To tie in with real-world issues at the time, a number of episodes revolved around ecological themes, such as Doc Terror's attempts to extort money from the governments of the world by threatening to destroy some aspect of the environment. The subject of magic is explored in "That Old Black Magic" when Ace becomes involved with a woman named Cassandra Cross, who is a practitioner of white magic. Her evil twin sister, Lilith, joins forces with Doc Terror in "Return of Cassandra". Both characters are voiced by B. J. Ward.

Ace also has other romantic interests; some of them reappear in later episodes, such as television reporter Jenny Rivers and Sealab technician Mei Lee. Ace's most elusive romantic pursuit is Crystal Kane, who later reveals she had lost a fiancé in action ("You Only Love Twice"). Ace has a romantic dream involving Crystal at the beginning of the episode "Firecracker". Crystal often resists Ace's advances either firmly or jokingly, but sometimes demonstrates she has affection and love for him. The two finally kiss at the conclusion of the two-part story "The Better Half".

Doc Terror is sometimes assisted by his daughter Amber. Like the Batman character Talia al Ghul, she sometimes shows affection for an enemy of her father (Jake Rockwell) and even betrays him when he goes too far ("Let the Lightning Fall").

The series also sometimes leaves an episode's ending up to viewer interpretation. In the two-part story "The Better Half", Doc Terror and Hacker's robotic halves, Syntax and Lesion, join together after a freak accident and become "Uniborg"; they turn on the two, forcing Terror and Hacker to ally with the Centurions. Upon breaking into Dominion and defeating their robotic counterparts, Terror is poised to destroy them, when they argue that he cannot kill them because they are his creations and an extension of himself and Hacker. Terror screams in anguish as he fires his disruptor cannon, and the episode ends with a scene on Skyvault, not revealing whether or not Terror intentionally misses or destroys Uniborg. In "To Dare Dominion", Terror unleashes a time/space vortex consumer within Dominion that plays havoc with reality. The Centurions are able to destroy it, but not before it wrecks Dominion's power generators, causing a violent explosion that seemingly kills Doc Terror and Hacker. The Centurions are beamed out before they suffer the same fate. Terror and Hacker's fate remains unresolved at the episode's conclusion, with Jake believing that they are finished, and Max arguing that they may not be.
Episodes were produced and broadcast in an anachronistic order. For example, the episodes which showcase the recruitment drive for the two extra Centurions ("Man or Machine" 5-parter) were produced long after several episodes showcasing the new additions.

Cast

Main voices
 Michael Bell – John Thunder
 Jennifer Darling – Amber
 Vince Edwards – Jake Rockwell
 Ron Feinberg – Doc Terror
 Pat Fraley – Max Ray, Dr. Wu
 Ed Gilbert – Hacker
 Diane Pershing – Crystal Kane
 Bob Ridgely – Rex Charger
 Neil Ross – Ace McCloud
 B. J. Ward – Cassandra Cross/Lilith Cross
 William Woodson – Opening Narration

Additional voices
 Richard "Dick" Gautier –
 Dan Gilvezan –
 Tress MacNeille –
 Mona Marshall –
 Bill E. Martin –
 Mea Martineau –
 David Mendenhall –
 Alan Oppenheimer –
 Patrick Pinney –
 Stanley Ralph Ross - Claw (in "To Dare Dominion")
 John Stephenson –
 Frank Welker –
 Keone Young –

Episodes

Five-part mini-series
 "The Sky Is on Fire" (1986.04.07): written by Ted Pedersen
 "Battle Beneath the Sea" (1986.04.08): written by Michael Reaves and Steve Perry
 "An Alien Affair" (1986.04.09): written by Ted Pedersen
 "Found: One Lost World" (1986.04.10): written by Don Glut
 "Sand Doom" (1986.04.11): written by Ted Pedersen

Season One
 "Whalesong" (1986.09.22): written by Gerry Conway and Carla Conway
 "Tornado of Terror" (1986.09.23): written by Gerry Conway and Carla Conway
 "Denver Is Down" (1986.09.24): written by Matt Uitz
 "Micro Menace" (1986.09.25): written by Jack Bornoff
 "Attack of the Plant-Borg" (1986.09.26): written by Don Goodman
 "Battle Beneath the Ice" (1986.09.29): written by Michael Reaves and Steve Perry
 "Operation Starfall" (1986.09.30): written by Michael Reaves
 "Let the Games Begin" (1986.10.01): written by Marc Scott Zicree
 "Firebird" (1986.10.02): written by Matt Uitz
 "Cold Calculations" (1986.10.03): written by Kayte Kuch
 "Return of Captain Steele" (1986.10.06): written by Michael Reaves
 "Three Strikes and You're Dead" (1986.10.07): written by Larry DiTillio
 "Double Agent" (1986.10.08): written by Creighton Barnes
 "Child's Play" (1986.10.09): written by Kayte Kuch
 "Terror on Ice" (1986.10.10): written by Herb Engelhardt
 "That Old Black Magic" (1986.10.13): written by Gerry Conway and Carla Conway
 "Max Ray...Traitor" (1986.10.14): written by Marc Scott Zicree
 "Crack the World" (1986.10.15): written by Gerry Conway and Carla Conway
 "The Incredible Shrinking Centurions" (1986.10.16): written by Michael Cassutt and Mark Cassutt
 "Live at Five" (1986.10.17): written by Michael Charles Hill
 "The Mummy's Curse" (1986.10.20): written by Gerry Conway and Carla Conway
 "Counterclock Crisis" (1986.10.21): written by Gerry Conway and Carla Conway
 "Zombie Master" (1986.10.22): written by Creighton Barnes
 "Malfunction" (1986.10.23): written by Creighton Barnes and Matt Uitz
 "Broken Beams" (1986.10.24): written by Herb Engelhardt
 "The Chameleon's Sting" (1986.10.27): written by Kayte Kuch
 "Film at Eleven" (1986.10.28): written by Michael Charles Hill
 "Hacker Must Be Destroyed" (1986.10.29): written by Don Glut
 "Showdown at Skystalk" (1986.10.30): written by Michael Reaves
 "The Warrior" (1986.10.31): written by Mark Edens
 "Return of Cassandra" (1986.11.03): written by Gerry Conway and Carla Conway
 "Night on Terror Mountain" (1986.11.04): written by Mel Gilden
 "Merlin" (1986.11.05): written by Kip Gordy
 "The Monsters from Below" (1986.11.06): written by Gary Greenfield
 "The Road Devils" (1986.11.07): written by Gary Greenfield
 "Zone Dancer" (1986.11.10): written by Michael Reaves
 "Firecracker" (1986.11.11): written by Larry DiTillio
 "Traitors Three" (1986.11.12): written by Barbara Hambly
 "You Only Love Twice" (1986.11.13): written by Martha Humphreys
 "Sungrazer" (1986.11.14): written by Michael Reaves
 "Novice" (1986.11.17): written by Herb Engelhardt
 "Breakout" (1986.11.18): written by Antoni Zalewski
 "Atlantis Adventure, Part I" (1986.11.19): written by Steve Perry and Ted Pedersen 
 "Atlantis Adventure, Part II" (1986.11.20): written by Steve Perry and Ted Pedersen
 "Ghost Warrior" (1986.11.21): written by Gerry Conway and Carla Conway
 "Let the Lightning Fall" (1986.11.24): written by Gerry Conway and Carla Conway
 "Cyborg Centurion" (1986.11.25): written by Michael Charles Hill
 "Day of the Animals" (1986.11.26): written by Steve Perry
 "To Dare Dominion, Part I" (1986.11.27): written by Michael Reaves and Steve Perry
 "To Dare Dominion, Part II" (1986.11.28): written by Michael Reaves and Steve Perry
 "Hole in the Ocean, Part I" (1986.12.01): written by Herb Engelhardt
 "Hole in the Ocean, Part II" (1986.12.02): written by Herb Engelhardt
 "The Better Half, Part I" (1986.12.03): written by Larry Huber
 "The Better Half, Part II" (1986.12.04): written by Larry Huber
 "Revenge" (1986.12.05): written by Kayte Kuch
 "Man or Machine, Part 1" (1986.12.08): written by Ted Pedersen and Steve Perry
 "Man or Machine, Part 2" (1986.12.09): written by Ted Pedersen and Steve Perry
 "Man or Machine, Part 3" (1986.12.10): written by Ted Pedersen and Steve Perry
 "Man or Machine, Part 4" (1986.12.11): written by Ted Pedersen and Steve Perry
 "Man or Machine, Part 5" (1986.12.12): written by Ted Pedersen and Steve Perry

Board Game
A board game called Centurions: Jake Rockwell's Battle to Stop Dr. Terror Game was released by Parker Brothers in 1986.

Home media
On December 6, 2011, Warner Home Video released The Centurions: The Original Miniseries on DVD in Region 1 via their Warner Archive Collection. This is a Manufacture-on-Demand (MOD) release, available exclusively through Warner's online store and only in the US. On July 21, 2015, Warner Archive released The Centurions: Part One on DVD in Region 1 which contains the first thirty episodes of the regular series. On March 15, 2016, Warner Archive released The Centurions: Part Two on DVD, which contains the remaining thirty episodes of the series.

References

External links

 
 Virtual Toychest: Centurions – has pictures of most of the toys
 "Nostalgia tops favourite toy list" article at bbc.co.uk

1980s American animated television series
1980s toys
1986 American television series debuts
1987 American television series endings
Action figures
American children's animated action television series
American children's animated adventure television series
American children's animated science fantasy television series
Comics based on toys
DC Comics titles
First-run syndicated television programs in the United States
Ruby-Spears superheroes
DC Comics superheroes
Television shows adapted into comics
Television series by Ruby-Spears
Television series set in the 21st century
Cyberpunk television series